William Long (died c.1426), of Rye, Sussex, was an English member of parliament.

He was a member (MP) of the Parliament of England for Rye in 1410, May 1413, November 1414, 1419 and 1420. He was the mayor of Rye August 1405-6 and 1407-10.

References

15th-century births
1426 deaths
15th-century English people
Mayors of Rye, East Sussex
Members of the Parliament of England (pre-1707)